Sweden sent a delegation to compete at the 2008 Summer Paralympics in Beijing.

Medalists

Archery

Women

Men

Athletics

Women's team

Men's team

Equestrian

Goalball

Women
Åsa Alverstedt,
Malin Gustavsson,
Maria Juliusson,
Josefine Jälmestål,
Sofia Naesström,
Anna Nilsson.

Preliminary

Semifinal

Bronze-medal match

Men
Jimmy Björkstrand,
Stefan Gahne,
Niklas Hultkvist,
Oskar Kuus,
Fatmir Seremeti,
Mikael Åkerberg.

Preliminary

Quarterfinal

Semifinal

Bronze-medal match

Judo

Sailing

Shooting

Men

Women

Swimming

Women

Men

Table tennis

Men

Women

Wheelchair basketball

Men:
Enoch Ablorh,
Joachim Gustavsson,
Hussein Haidari,
Peter Kohlström,
Joakim Lindén,
Patrik Nylander,
Tomas Åkerberg,
Niclas Larsson,
Per Byquist,
Dan Wallin,
Thomas Larsson,
Robin Meng.

Group A

Classification 9TH-12TH

Classification 11TH-12TH

Wheelchair tennis

See also
2008 Summer Paralympics
Sweden at the Paralympics
Sweden at the 2008 Summer Olympics

External links
Beijing 2008 Paralympic Games Official Site
International Paralympic Committee
Svenska Handikappidrottsförbundet - Beijing 2008

References

Nations at the 2008 Summer Paralympics
2008
Paralympics